"Whip-Smart" is a song by American singer-songwriter Liz Phair from her second album Whip-Smart, released in 1994. The song interpolates the chorus from Malcolm McLaren's 1983 hit "Double Dutch."

The song peaked at No. 24 on the Modern Rock Tracks chart.

Track listing

References

1994 singles
1994 songs
Liz Phair songs
Matador Records singles
Songs written by Liz Phair
Songs written by Malcolm McLaren